In the context of a copyright discussion, Bridgeman refers to Bridgeman Art Library v. Corel Corp.

Bridgeman often refers to the Bridgeman Art Library.

Bridgeman is also a surname [see also Bridgman], and may refer to the following people:

A
Alexander Bridgeman, Viscount Newport

C
Charles Bridgeman

E
Edward Bridgeman

F
Francis Bridgeman (Royal Navy officer)
Francis Bridgeman (British Army officer)
Sir Francis Bridgeman, 3rd Baronet

G
Geoffrey Bridgeman
George Bridgman
George Bridgeman, 2nd Earl of Bradford
George Bridgeman, 4th Earl of Bradford
Gerald Bridgeman, 6th Earl of Bradford

H
Harriet Bridgeman
Harry A. Bridgeman (1877-1955), American politician and railroad locomotive engineer
Henry Bridgeman, 1st Baron Bradford
Henry Bridgeman, British Army officer

J
John Bridgeman (bishop)
John Bridgeman (sculptor)
Sir John Bridgeman, 2nd Baronet
Sir John Bridgeman, 3rd Baronet
Junior Bridgeman (born 1953), American basketball player and businessman

L
Luke Bridgeman

M
Maurice Bridgeman

O
Orlando Bridgeman, 1st Earl of Bradford
Orlando Bridgeman, 3rd Earl of Bradford
Orlando Bridgeman, 5th Earl of Bradford
Sir Orlando Bridgeman, 1st Baronet, of Great Lever
Sir Orlando Bridgeman, 1st Baronet, of Ridley
Sir Orlando Bridgeman, 2nd Baronet
Sir Orlando Bridgeman, 4th Baronet

P
Peter Bridgeman
Percy Williams Bridgman, an American physicist
Bridgman–Stockbarger technique

R
Reginald Bridgeman
Richard Bridgeman, 7th Earl of Bradford
Robert Bridgeman, 2nd Viscount Bridgeman
Robin Bridgeman, 3rd Viscount Bridgeman

W
William B. Bridgeman
William Clive Bridgeman

See also

 Beijing Sitong Bridge protest, whose protestor is frequently noted as "Bridge Man"
 Bridgeman Art Library v. Corel Corp.
 Linford Bridgeman (firm)
 Bridgman